Sergey Patsay (born 14 December 1967) is a Kazakhstani retired footballer who last played for Záhonyi VSC in Hungary. He made two appearances for the Kazakhstan national team in 1992.

Career
Patsay started his senior career with RShVSM Alma-Ata. After that, he played for Taraz, Alga Bishkek, Neftchi Fergana, Shakhter Karagandy, Zorya Luhansk, Nyíregyháza Spartacus, Hajdúnánási, and Kazincbarcikai SC. In 1995, he signed for Tsesna, where he made twenty-six league appearances and scored ten goals.

References

External links 
 Forgotten names. Sergey Patsay
 Sergey Patsay: “Some Shakhtar players could play in Europe”
 Beware, Hungarians, the match against the Latvians is important for Kazakhstan!
 Balmazújváros – Sergei Pacaj knows that they can no longer make mistakes 
 Waiting for the season – Sergei Pacaj

1967 births
Living people
Kazakhstani footballers
Kazakhstani football managers
Kazakhstan international footballers
Association footballers not categorized by position